Matoniaceae is one of the three families of ferns in the Gleicheniales order of the Polypodiopsida class. Fossil records reveal that Matoniaceae ferns were abundant during the Mesozoic era (about 250-million to 66-million years ago), during which they lived on every continent, including Antarctica, with eight genera and 26 species, with the oldest known specimens being from the Middle Triassic of Antarctica. Today the family is much less abundant, and also less diverse, with only two extant genera and four species, which are limited to portions of southeastern Asia.

The following diagram shows a likely phylogenic relationship with the other two families of the Gleicheniales.

Extant taxa

 genus 
 species 
 species 
 genus 
 species 
 species

Mesozoic subtaxa

Some common Mesozoic Matoniaceae genera and a sampling of their species include:

 genus 
 species 
 species 
 genus 
 species 
 species 
 species 
 species 
 species 
 genus 
 genus 
 species 
 species 
 species 
 species 
 species 
 genus Microdictyon
 genus 
Tomaniopteris Klavins et al. Fremouw Formation, Middle Triassic, Antarctica
Konijnenburgia Kvaček et Dašková, 2010 Piedra Clavada Formation, Argentina, Albian

References

Gleicheniales
Fern families